Meacham is a surname. Notable people with the surname include:

Bob Meacham, former Major League Baseball player
Doug Meacham, American football coach
Ellis K. Meacham (1913–1998), author and jurist
F. W. Meacham (1856–1909), American composer
John A. Meacham, Jack, professor
Jon Meacham (born 1969), journalist, biographer of American presidents
Joseph Meacham (1742–1796), early leader of the Shakers
Mildred Meacham (1924–2017), All-American Girls Professional Baseball League player
William Meacham, archaeologist specializing in South China

See also
Meacham, Oregon
Meacham, Saskatchewan
Mecham
Mechem
Robert Meachem, American football player
Meacham International Airport in Fort Worth, Texas